O'Connor & Associates was a Chicago-based options trading firm, with a particular emphasis on financial derivatives. The firm was founded in 1977 by John F. O'Connor and his brother-in-law, Robert J. Creamer. In 1992, O'Connor & Associates was acquired by Swiss Bank Corporation. The acquisition was part of Swiss Bank's efforts to expand its options trading capabilities in the United States. At the time of the acquisition, O'Connor & Associates had over 500 employees and was one of the largest options trading firms in the world. 

After the acquisition, O'Connor & Associates continued to operate as a subsidiary of Swiss Bank Corporation. In 1998, Swiss Bank Corporation merged with Union Bank of Switzerland to form UBS. As part of the merger, O'Connor & Associates was integrated into UBS's investment banking division. The firm continued to operate as UBS O'Connor.

UBS O'Connor 
As a result of the merger, UBS O'Connor now operates as a hedge fund, which is a distinct investment area within UBS Asset Management with complete independence in regard to investment decision-making. The business' capabilities cover a range of investment strategies, which seek to achieve risk-adjusted absolute returns with low correlation to most major asset classes and traditional investment benchmarks.

O'Connor's capabilities cover a wide range of investment programs, which seek to achieve attractive risk-adjusted absolute returns with low correlation to most major asset classes and traditional investment benchmarks. In the new position, Blake Hiltabrand will be heading the company's global operations, while Bernard Ahkong and Casey Talbot will be the co-CIOs for the company's flagship Global Multi-Strategy portfolio. 

O'Connor managed $11 billion in hedge fund strategies as of June 1, 2022.

History
O'Connor was founded in 1977 by mathematician Michael Greenbaum and was named for Edmund (Ed) and Williams (Bill) O'Connor.  The O'Connor brothers had made a fortune trading grain on the Chicago Board of Trade and founded First Options, a clearing house.  The O'Connors provided Greenbaum, who had run risk management for First Options, with the capital to start his own firm. 

SBC had established a strategic relationship with O'Connor, which was the largest market maker in the financial options exchanges in the U.S., beginning in 1988.  O'Connor had been looking to partner with a larger financial institution.  O'Connor entered into a currency joint venture with SBC, in 1989, that proved to be the first step towards a sale of O'Connor to SBC.   

Following a 1992 merger, O'Connor was combined with SBC's money market, capital market, and currency market activities to form a globally integrated capital markets and treasury operation.

A number of O'Connor executives were brought into key positions within Swiss Bank.

References

UBS
Former investment banks of the United States
American companies established in 1977
Banks established in 1977
American companies disestablished in 1992
Banks disestablished in 1992
1977 establishments in Illinois
1992 disestablishments in Illinois